Allotinus thalebanus is a butterfly in the family Lycaenidae. It was described by Murayama and Kimura in 1990. It is found in Thailand.

References

Butterflies described in 1990
Allotinus